Mark Carter may refer to:

 Mark Carter (rugby) (born 1968), New Zealand former rugby football player
 Mark Carter (footballer) (born 1960), English former footballer
 Mark Bonham Carter, Baron Bonham-Carter (1922–1994), English publisher and politician